George Frederick Baer (September 26, 1842 – April 26, 1914) was an American lawyer who was the President of the Philadelphia and Reading Railroad and spokesman for the owners during the Anthracite Coal Strike of 1902.

Biography
George Baer was born in Lavansville, Somerset County, Pennsylvania, and attended the Somerset Institute and Somerset Academy for a high school education. At the age of thirteen, Baer dropped out of school and became a "printer's devil" at a local newspaper, the Somerset Democrat, and later attended Franklin and Marshall College. He and his brother acquired the Democrat in 1861, and in 1862 he raised a company of volunteers for the Union Army during the American Civil War. In the 133rd Pennsylvania Volunteers, Baer served as a captain at the battles of Antietam, Fredericksburg, and Chancellorsville.

Baer studied law and was admitted to the bar in 1864. He moved to Reading, Pennsylvania in 1868 and established a law practice. He was later hired by the Philadelphia and Reading Railroad as their counsel.

In 1901, Baer was installed by financier J. P. Morgan as the president of the Reading Railroad after the retirement of his predecessor, Joseph Smith Harris. Soon thereafter, Baer was confronted with the Coal Strike of 1902 in the anthracite coal fields of eastern Pennsylvania, the largest united strike of the United Mine Workers. The Reading was a major employer in the region, and Baer refused to put down the strike or speak to the strikers, citing Social Darwinist ideas. Baer's attitude was released into the papers and became an example of arrogance and superiority. Finally, President Theodore Roosevelt intervened and settled the strike in favor of the striking workers.

Baer's statements on workers and labor relations became rallying cries for the unions. Most famously he wrote in a letter, later leaked to the press, "The rights and interests of the laboring man will be protected and cared for -- not by the labor agitators, but by the Christian men of property to whom God has given control of the property rights of the country, and upon the successful management of which so much depends." In closing statements on behalf of the coal managers to the government's Anthracite Coal Commission he stated, on the subject of working conditions, "These men don't suffer. Why, hell, half of them don't even speak English."

Baer was also named the president of Franklin and Marshall College in 1894 and retained the post until he died in 1914. He married Emily Kimmel in 1866 and had five daughters.

See also

 List of railroad executives

References

External links
 Encyclopedia of World Biography Entry
 Article citing Baer's anti-union statements
 Image of Edward Sorel poster based on Baer quotation

20th-century American railroad executives
Reading Company people
1842 births
1914 deaths
Franklin & Marshall College alumni
Presidents of Franklin & Marshall College
People from Somerset County, Pennsylvania
People of Pennsylvania in the American Civil War
Burials in Pennsylvania
19th-century American lawyers
19th-century American businesspeople